Rae Hendrie (born 30 November 1976, Selkirk) is a Scottish actress known for her role as Jess Mackenzie in the BBC TV series Monarch of the Glen. 

As a child, she sang in classical concerts. She later sang in her role on Monarch of the Glen. Prior to being cast in Monarch, Rae was a London classroom assistant working with children with special education needs. She also appeared in an episode of Taggart in 2002, playing Sadie McPhail, and in 2006 had a role in EastEnders playing Briony Campbell.

Filmography
EastEnders playing Briony Campbell, 2006
Sea of Souls playing Shiela, 2006
Meet the Magoons playing Selina, 2005
Murphy's Law playing Gina, 2005
Holby City playing Lizzie Hart, 2005
The Bill playing Tara, 2003
Taggart playing Sadie McPhail, 2002
Rockface playing Nurse Jo, 2002, 2003
Monarch of the Glen, 2001-2005

External links

References

1976 births
Living people
Scottish television actresses
Scottish soap opera actresses
People from Selkirk, Scottish Borders